Timothy Gleeson (born 1881) was an Irish hurler who played for the Tipperary senior team.

Gleeson joined the team during the 1905 championship and was a regular member of the starting fifteen until his retirement after the 1913 championship. During that time he won two All-Ireland medals and three Munster medals.

At club level Gleeson enjoyed a lengthy career with Clonoulty–Rossmore and Holycross–Ballycahill.

References

Teams

1881 births
Clonoulty-Rossmore hurlers
Holycross-Ballycahill hurlers
Tipperary inter-county hurlers
All-Ireland Senior Hurling Championship winners
Year of death missing